Ak-Jar is a village in Kochkor District of Naryn Region of Kyrgyzstan. Its population was 2,207 in 2021.

References
 

Populated places in Naryn Region